Sarah Lean is an English author of children's literature, known for her book A Dog Called Homeless, which received the 2013 Schneider Family Book Award...

Early life and career 
Lean was born in Wells, Somerset, England. Before attending university she held a number of different jobs such as a page-planner, a stencil-maker and a gardener. She earned a first class degree in English at the University of Winchester with the intent to become a primary school teacher, but soon returned to university to complete an MA in Creative and Critical Writing.

She published her first book, A Dog Called Homeless, in 2012. It sold over 15,000 copies, and was awarded the Schneider Family Book Award for Middle School books in 2013.

In 2014, Lean was named a chosen author of World Book Day.

Her books have been described as "inspiring", "compelling", and "touching".

Bibliography

References

External links 

 Sarah Lean's website

Living people
English children's writers
British women children's writers
21st-century English writers
21st-century English women writers
People from Wells, Somerset
Alumni of the University of Winchester
Year of birth missing (living people)